The Lebanese Navy ( Al-qūwātu al-Baḥriyya al-Lubnāniyya, literally "the Lebanese Sea Forces") is the navy of the Lebanese Armed Forces. It was formed in 1950 and based in Beirut Naval Base, Lebanon's first naval base. The navy, which currently lacks the proper number of equipment, has a number of approximately 69 vessels of various sizes and roles; however, the navy is trying to modernize itself, and increase its size. The flag of the Lebanese navy depicts a Phoenician ship with the Lebanese Cedar tree, positioned on an anchor above the Arabic inscription of the navy's name.

The Lebanese government approved on January 16, 2009, a request by the Lebanese Ministry of Defense to build a new naval base on the shores of Nahr el-Bared Palestinian refugee camp in northern Lebanon.

Equipment

Current fleet list

On February 19, 2015, the Saudi press agency quoted on a Saudi official that Saudi Arabia had halted the $3 billion program for military supplies to Lebanon. The Lebanese Navy does not have any operational vessels maneouvrable in difficult weather conditions and undergoes difficulties in accomplishing Search and Rescue missions, Marine Safety, Marine Environmental Protection, Maritime Law Enforcement and the controlling of illegal migrant traffic to Europe. Also, Lebanon intends to provide protection for the future natural gas  installations and enforce the Law and State authority in Lebanese territorial waters. Lebanon counts on the US military aid to be equipped with multi-function vessels with a wide range of capabilities such as the RiverHawk OSV 60.

In May 2021, The United States announced that it donate 7 ships to the Lebanese Navy

Coastal Radar Stations

The Lebanese Navy is in charge of the coastal radar stations, in 1992, three stations in all of Tripoli, Sidon, and Tyre were established, followed by upgrades and new stations in 1997. However, during the 2006 Lebanon War all of the stations were bombed by the Israeli Navy. After the war ended, Germany and Lebanon signed a bilateral agreement to establish The Coastal Radar Organization (CRO) which aimed to create and consolidate a chain of seven coastal radar stations with the ability to cover the entire Mediterranean coast of Lebanon. Three of these stations are older and were refurbished with new equipment and facilities; the four other are new installations.

Surveillance
In February, 2008, the Lebanese navy ordered six Pharos XLR3+ Long Range Multisensor Surveillance Platforms in order to equip their naval stations which lack 24/7 long-range surveillance and reconnaissance capabilities in all weather conditions.

Training
The Lebanese Naval Forces send nearly all of their Navy officers for training abroad in a variety of European countries as well as the United States. Each country offers different training depending on the specializations of each officer. Officers sent to the United States have undergone schooling in surface warfare and experienced on job training with the US Coast Guard. Many Lebanese Naval Forces Engineers head to France where they receive education regarding detection, transmission, and artillery. Skills used in much of the domestic duties of the Lebanese Naval Forces from initial staff courses, amphibious training, and maritime drug enforcement are taught at British academies. The skills of the Lebanese Naval Forces are not incredibly diverse or necessarily advanced to the level of European countries due to their limited human resources and equipments.

Cooperation with the UNIFIL MTF
The existence of the UNIFIL Maritime Task Force is helping the Lebanese Navy to enhance the skills of its personnel through the periodical joint exercises and daily cooperation. Upon the arrival of the MTF to the region (after the 2006 Lebanon War), the Lebanese Navy began jointly working with the navy in lead, which at the time was the Italian Navy, in order to insure a successful outcome to the assigned peace operation.

See also
 Marine Commandos
 Lebanese Army Naval Academy
 Lebanese Sea Rescue Unit
 List of navies

References

External links 
 

Military of Lebanon
Lebanon
Military units and formations established in 1950